"I Can't Wait" is the seventh single from Senegalese singer-songwriter Akon's second studio album, Konvicted. The song was released as a digital download only single on April 14, 2008. The song features additional vocals from R&B singer and rapper T-Pain. The song was added to and peaked at the C-list on BBC Radio 1's playlist. The song reached #116 on the UK Singles Chart. The original version of the song was entitled "You and Me", and was written for T-Pain's debut album, Rappa Ternt Sanga.

Music video
The video consists of the same scene of Akon getting out of a Rolls-Royce Phantom Drophead Coupé and seeing a girl he likes. The first time he ignores the girl and walks into the club. He then arrives at another club and sees the girl for a second time and attempts to talk to her, but she is with another man. On the third attempt he is successful and walks home with the girl, entering her house with her. The chorus scenes involve Akon standing while T-Pain playing the piano, with a white Lamborghini Murciélago in the background.

Track listing
 "I Can't Wait" (Radio Edit) – 3:46

Charts

Release history

References

2006 songs
2008 singles
Akon songs
T-Pain songs
Song recordings produced by T-Pain
Songs written by Akon
Songs written by T-Pain